China–Mongolia relations refer to the bilateral relations between Mongolia and China. These relations have long been determined by the relations between China and the Soviet Union, Mongolia's other neighbour and main ally until early 1990. With the rapprochement between the USSR and China in the late 1980s, Chinese-Mongolian relations also began to improve. Since the 1990s, China has become Mongolia's biggest trading partner, and a number of Chinese businesses operate in Mongolia.

Background 

The Han and Mongol (as well as their ancestors, the Proto-Mongols) peoples have been in contact with each other for millennia.

Throughout history, polities in the Central Plains and the Mongolian Plateau have had complicated relations. The Tang dynasty, following its defeat of the Xueyantuo, established the Protectorate General to Pacify the North in 647 to rule the Mongolian Plateau. The Great Wall was constructed to ward off attacks by nomads from the north, notably during the Ming dynasty.

In 1271, the Mongols under Kublai Khan, grandson of Genghis Khan, established the Yuan dynasty as a Chinese dynasty and conquered all of China proper in 1279. In 1368, the Ming dynasty successfully overthrew the Yuan dynasty and the remnant Yuan imperial court was forced to retreat north, thereby forming the Northern Yuan dynasty.

The Ming Great Wall was strengthened and the period was characterized by repeated Ming raids into Northern Yuan territory and vice versa. During the transition from Ming to Qing, the Northern Yuan monarch Ligdan Khan allied with the Ming against the Qing dynasty until Ligdan was defeated by Qing forces and Inner Mongolia was conquered by the Qing. In 1644, the Ming dynasty was overthrown by peasant rebels under Li Zicheng, who established the short-lived Shun dynasty which would soon be defeated by the Qing dynasty. During the Qing rule from 1691, Inner Mongolia and Outer Mongolia were incorporated into the empire.

After the fall of the Qing dynasty in 1911, the Republic of China was established and Outer Mongolia declared its independence after more than 200 years of Qing rule. During this period, the Beiyang government of the Republic of China, as the successor to the Qing, claimed Outer Mongolia as Chinese territory. This claim was provided for in the Imperial Edict of the Abdication of the Qing Emperor signed by the Empress Dowager Longyu on behalf of the six-year-old Xuantong Emperor: "[...] the continued territorial integrity of the lands of the five races, Manchu, Han, Mongol, Hui, and Tibetan into one great Republic of China" ([...] ). However, the Chinese government lacked any stable control over the region due to massive civil wars in the south and the rise of regional warlords in the Warlord Era. Consequently, Outer Mongolia sought Russian support to claim its independence. In 1919, Chinese general Xu Shuzheng advanced into Outer Mongolia and annulled its independence. In 1921, Chinese forces were driven out by White Russian forces led by Baron Roman von Ungern-Sternberg. Some months later they were driven out by the Red Army of the Russian Soviet Federative Socialist Republic, the Far Eastern Republic and pro-Soviet Mongolian forces. In 1924, the Mongolian People's Republic was proclaimed. With the onset of the Japanese invasion of China, little effort was given to reestablish Chinese control over Outer Mongolia.

Following the end of World War II, the Republic of China, led by the Kuomintang, was forced to formally accept Outer Mongolian independence under Soviet pressure, but this recognition was revoked in 1953. In 1949, the Communists won the Chinese Civil War and re-recognized Mongolia's independent status.

Communist era

The People's Republic of China established diplomatic relations with Mongolia on October 16, 1949, and both nations signed a border treaty in 1962. With the Sino-Soviet split, Mongolia aligned itself with the Soviet Union and asked for the deployment of Soviet forces, leading to security concerns in China. As a result, bilateral ties remained tense until 1984, when a high-level Chinese delegation visited Mongolia and both nations began to survey and demarcate their borders. Mongolian General Secretary Jambyn Batmönkh, during a meeting with President Kim Il sung while on a state visit to Pyongyang in November 1986 states that "renewing the development of China-Mongolian relations is important for our two countries’ people's common interest". In 1986, a series of agreements to bolster trade and establish transport and air links was signed. In 1988, both nations signed a treaty on border control. Mongolia also began asserting a more independent policy and pursued more friendly ties with China.

Modern period 

In the Post-Cold War era, China has taken major steps to normalise its relationship with Mongolia, emphasizing its respect for Mongolia's sovereignty and independence. In 1994, Chinese Premier Li Peng signed a treaty of friendship and cooperation. China has become Mongolia's biggest trade partner and source of foreign investment. Bilateral trade reached US$1.13 billion by the first nine months of 2007, registering an increase of 90% from 2006. China offered Mongolia permission to using the Port of Tianjin to give it and its goods access to trade within the Asia Pacific region. China also expanded its investments in Mongolia's mining industries, giving it access to the country's natural resources. Mongolia is also a participant in the Belt and Road Initiative. China is likely to support Mongolia's membership in to the Asia Cooperation Dialogue (ACD), Asia-Pacific Economic Cooperation (APEC) and granting it observer status in the Shanghai Cooperation Organisation.

See also
China–Mongolia border
Mongolia-Taiwan relations
Battle of Baitag Bogd
Vostok 2018
2015 China Victory Day Parade

References

Further reading

 Ginsburg, Tom. "Political reform in Mongolia: between Russia and China." Asian Survey 35.5 (1995): 459–471.
 Paine, Sarah CM. Imperial rivals: China, Russia, and their disputed frontier (ME Sharpe, 1996).
 Perdue, Peter C. "Military Mobilization in Seventeenth and Eighteenth-Century China, Russia, and Mongolia." Modern Asian Studies 30.4 (1996): 757–793.
 Perdue, Peter C. "Boundaries, maps, and movement: Chinese, Russian, and Mongolian empires in early modern Central Eurasia." International History Review 20.2 (1998): 263–286.
 Reeves, Jeffrey. "Rethinking weak state behavior: Mongolia’s foreign policy toward China." International Politics 51.2 (2014): 254–271.

 
Mongolia
Bilateral relations of Mongolia